Hard is the fourth studio album by American R&B group Jagged Edge. It was released by Sony Urban Music and Columbia Records on October 14, 2003 in the United States. The album debuted at number 3 on the US Billboard 200 with first-week sales of 178,000 copies in the US. It has been certified gold by the Recording Industry Association of America (RIAA) and has sold 871,000 copies domestically. The album spawned two singles, including the top ten single "Walked Outta Heaven."

Track listing

Samples
 "Visions" contains samples from the composition "You Are My Starship" written by Michael Henderson.
 "Shady Girl" contains samples from the composition "Uptown Anthem" by Naughty by Nature.

Charts

Weekly charts

Year-end charts

Certifications

References

External links

2003 albums
Albums produced by Bryan-Michael Cox
Albums produced by Jermaine Dupri
Jagged Edge (American group) albums